Events in the year 1580 in Norway.

Incumbents
Monarch: Frederick II

Events

Arts and literature

Births

2 February – Jens Bjelke, nobleman, Chancellor of Norway (died 1659).

Deaths

See also

References